Hathras City railway station is a railway station in Hathras district, Uttar Pradesh. Its station code is HTC.

About
Hathras City railway station is a two-platform station serving Hathras City. From this station there are links to the Hathras Junction, Hathras Road, Hathras Killah (Fort), Mendu and New Hathras railway stations, though the last is a dedicated freight corridor serving freight trains only.

See also
 Hathras Road railway station
 Hathras Kila railway station
 Hathras Junction railway station
 Kasganj Junction railway station
 Mathura Junction
 Agra Cantonment railway station

References

External links

Railway junction stations in India
Railway stations in Hathras district
Izzatnagar railway division
Railway stations opened in 1965
Hathras